Ernst Alexander August George Wichert (11 March 1831 – 21 January 1902) was a German lawyer, judge, and author.

Biography
Wichert was born in Insterburg, Prussia, (today Chernyakhovsk, Russia) and attended schools in Pillau and Königsberg.

He studied law at the University of Königsberg and worked as an assessor in Memel. In 1860 Wichert became a district judge in Prökuls (today Priekulė, Lithuania). In 1863 he returned to Königsberg as a judge of the local court and became an Oberlandesgerichtsrat in 1877 (sometimes also 1879 is reported). In 1888 Wichert moved to Berlin, where he became Kammergerichtsrat at the Berlin Kammergericht. He retired in 1896 and died in 1902.

While performing his duties as a judge, in his spare time Wichert wrote and published 34 stage plays, 28 novels and 15 multi-volume novellas.

Works

Stage plays 
 Unser General York, 1858
 Der Withing von Samland, 1860
 Licht und Schatten, 1861
 Der Narr des Glücks, 1871
 Ein Schritt vom Wege, 1873
 Die Realisten, 1874
 Biegen oder Brechen, 1874
 An der Majorsecke, 1875
 Die Frau für die Welt, 1876
 Der Freund des Fürsten, 1879
 Peter Munk, 1882
 Im Dienst der Pflicht, 1896
 Als Verlobte empfehlen sich

Novels and novellas
 Aus anständiger Familie, 1866
 Ein hässlicher Mensch, 1868
 Die Arbeiter, 1873
 Heinrich von Plauen, 1881 Online version
 Litauische Geschichten, 1881
 Aus dem Leben, Novella, 1882
 Unter einer Decke, Novella, 1883
 Der Große Kurfürst in Preußen, 1887
 Die Taube auf dem Dache, 1892
 Frauengegestalten, 1894
 Die Schwestern, 1896
 Der Bürgermeister von Thorn
 Kleine Passionen

Autobiography
 Richter und Dichter. Ein Lebensausweis, 1899

Screen adaption
 Elzes Leben (Elzė iš Giljos), a film version of Der Schaktarp, (Lit-D, 1999), directed by Algimantas Puipa, appearing Endrikis Andrius Paulavičius, Elzė Eglė Jaselskytė, Aušra Venckunaitė

Literature
 Margot Braun: Ernst Wicherts Roman "Der Große Kurfürst in Preußen". Ein Beitrag zur Geschichte des historischen Romans im 19. Jahrhundert. Würzburg-Aumühle

References

External links
 

 Gustav Freytag und Ernst Wichert
  Ernst Wichert'' In: Datenbank Projekt Historischer Roman. University of Innsbruck.

1831 births
1902 deaths
People from the Province of Prussia
People from Insterburg
University of Königsberg alumni
German male novelists
German male dramatists and playwrights
19th-century German dramatists and playwrights
19th-century German novelists
19th-century German male writers